Hygrophorus cossus is a species of fungus in the genus Hygrophorus. It is known for having a white color with a brownish tinge on its fruiting body.

References

cossus
Fungi of Europe
Fungi described in 1799
Taxa named by James Sowerby